Woermann may refer to

 Adolph Woermann
 SS Adolph Woermann
 Karl Woermann
 Woermann-Linie
 Woermann Tower
 Woermann's bat